Girls in Prison may refer to:
 Girls in Prison (1956 film), a drama/sexploitation women in prison film
 Girls in Prison (1994 film), an American television film